The House of Vijaya (also known as the Vijayan dynasty and sometimes referred to as the "Great Dynasty") was the first recorded Sinhalese royal dynasty that ruled over the island, Sri Lanka. According to Sri Lankan historical literature Prince Vijaya is the traditional first king of Sri Lanka, founding the Kingdom of Tambapanni and the dynasty subsequently founding the Kingdom of Upatissa Nuwara and finally the Anuradhapura Kingdom.

There were 37 Vijayan monarchs who reigned during a span of 609 years and ruled all but 80 of them. The dynasty ended when Vasabha of the House of Lambakanna I seized power in 66 AD.

Origins

In 543 BC, prince Vijaya (543–505 BC) arrived in Sri Lanka, having been banished from his homeland in India. He eventually brought the island under his control and established himself as king. After this, his retinue established villages and colonies throughout the country. One of these was established by Anuradha, a minister of King Vijaya, on the banks of a stream called Kolon and was named Anuradhagama.

Reign

Tambapanni

According to popular tradition, the Kingdom of Tambapanni was founded by Prince Vijaya and his 700 followers after landing on the island, in a district near modern day Mannar which is believed to be the district of Chilaw, after leaving Suppāraka. It is recorded the Vijaya made his landing on the day of Buddha's death. Vijaya claimed Tambapanni his capital and soon the whole island come under this name. Tambapanni was originally inhabited and governed by Yakkhas, having their capital at Sirīsavatthu and their queen Kuveni. According to the Samyutta Commentary, Tambapanni was one hundred leagues in extent.

During the end of his reign Vijaya, who was having trouble choosing a successor, sent a letter to the city of his ancestors, Sinhapura, in order to invite his brother Sumitta to take over the throne. However Vijaya had died before the letter had reached its destination so the elected minister of the people Upatissa, the Chief government minister or prime minister and leading chief among the Sinhalese became regent and acted as regent for a year. After his coronation which was held in the Kingdom of Tambapanni, he left it building another one bearing his own name. While his was king, Upatissa established the new capital Upatissagāma, in which the kingdom was moved to from the Kingdom of Tambapanni. When Vijaya's letter arrived Sumitta had already succeeded his father as king of his country, and so he sent his son Panduvasdeva to rule Upatissa Nuwara.

Upatissagāma was seven or eight miles further north of Tambapanni. It was named after the regent king Upatissa, who was the prime minister of Vijaya.

Anuradhapura

In 377 BC, King Pandukabhaya (437–367 BC) made Anuradhapura his capital and developed it into a prosperous city. Anuradhapura (Anurapura) was named after the minister who first established the village and after a grandfather of Pandukabhaya who lived there. The name was also derived from the city's establishment on the auspicious asterism called Anura. Anuradhapura was the capital of all the monarchs who ruled from the dynasty.

The consecration ceremonies and rituals associated with kingship began during the reign of Devanampiya Tissa, under the influence of Ashoka of India. The whole country was brought under the rule of a single monarch by Dutthagamani for the first time. Before this, it had several principalities independent of the Anuradhapura Kingdom. The king of Anuradhapura was seen as the supreme ruler throughout the island, even at times when he did not have absolute control over it.

Several invasions have been made against the Anuradhapura Kingdom, all of which were launched from South India. The first invasion recorded in the history of the country is during the reign of Suratissa (247–237 BC), where he was overthrown by two horse dealers from South India named Sena and Guththika. After ruling the country for 22 years, they were defeated by Asela (215–205 BC), who was in turn overthrown by another invasion led by a Chola prince named Ellalan (205–161 BC). Elara ruled for 44 years before being defeated by Dutthagamani. The country was invaded again in 103 BC by five Dravidian chiefs, who ruled until 89 BC when they were defeated by Valagamba.

Genealogy

The House of Vijaya claimed a close relationship to the Shakya dynasty, family of the Gautama Buddha.

Timeline

See also
 Sinhapura
 Shakya

Notes

References

Bibliography

External links
 Genealogy of the House of Vijaya

 
6th-century BC establishments in Sri Lanka
1st-century disestablishments in Sri Lanka